Albert Geddis Martinez, better known as Alpo Martinez, Abraham G. Rodriquez (witness protection), or more simply as Alpo or Po (June 8, 1966 – October 31, 2021) was an American drug dealer from Harlem, New York City of Puerto Rican descent. Martinez rose to prominence in the mid–1980s. In addition to New York, Martinez expanded his drug trade to other  cities, notably Washington, D.C.

Biography 
Martinez started selling drugs at 13 years old in the East Harlem section of New York. In 1985 he met West Side Harlem drug dealer Azie Faison, Martinez started to move up the chain of drug dealers in Harlem and eventually became one of the biggest drug dealers in the city. Martinez later moved to Washington, D.C. to expand operations where he quickly became involved in the city's underworld and elevated his drug activities. He met Wayne 'Silk' Perry, a notorious gangster and D.C. enforcer, who would later become his bodyguard and hitman.

Arrest 
On November 7, 1991, Martinez was arrested in Washington, D.C. for selling drugs. He was charged with conspiracy to commit murder, various drug charges, and 14 counts of murder, including the murder of D.C drug dealer Michael Anthony Salters aka Fray and Brooklyn drug dealer Demencio Benson. Facing the possibility of either the death penalty or life imprisonment without the possibility of parole, Martinez turned informant and testified against members of his organization. For his testimony against Perry (who received five consecutive life sentences without the possibility of parole), Martinez was sentenced to 35 years in prison.

2015 release
Martinez was released in 2015 while serving a 25-year sentence for 14 counts of murder at ADX Florence, a federal supermax prison located in Fremont County, Colorado. He was released after testifying against former associates and had been living under a United States witness protection program in Lewiston, Maine, under the assumed name, Abraham G. Rodriquez, until shortly before his death in 2021. According to the website, Martinez was in the federal witness protection program awaiting a new identity.

Death 
On the morning of October 31, 2021, at 3:30am, Martinez was fatally shot five times in Harlem, New York, while seated in his 2017 Dodge Ram according to various media outlets including The Source magazine, Hot 97, AllHipHop and The New York Times. Shakeem Parker was later charged with his murder. Several media outlets later reported that Martinez was killed over a road rage incident.

In popular culture 
Martinez was portrayed by rapper and actor Cam'ron in the 2002 film Paid In Full which was based on the criminal exploits of Martinez, Azie Faison and Rich Porter. Martinez is referenced in several hip hop and rap songs, including:

 50 Cent – Ghetto Qu'ran
 Big L – American Dream
 Bodega Bamz – Bam Bam
 Camron – Double Up
 Don Trip & Starlito – Caesar and Brutus
 Drake – Talk Up ft. Jay-Z
 Eastside 80s – Alpo
 Elcamino – Venice Beach ft. Benny the Butcher
 Elias – Alpo Martinez
 Freddie Gibbs and Madlib – Palmolive ft. Pusha T and Killer Mike
 Future – In Her Mouth
 The Game – Money
 The Game – My Life
 Jay-Z – La Familia
 K Koke – Why Not
 Lil Boosie – Betrayed
 Lucki - MADE MY DAY
 Meek Mill – Rich Porter
 Meek Mill – Tony Story
 Memphis Bleek – My Mind Right (Remix)
 Mysonne's "Freestyle on Funk Flex [Hot 97]"
 Nas – Memory Lane (Sittin' In Da Park)
 Nas – Accident Murderers
 Popperazzi Po – Alpo
 Pusha T – F.I.F.A.
 Shad Da God – Rich & Alpo
 Shyne – That's Gangsta
 Uncle Murda – Rap Up 2021
Youngs Teflon & K-Trap – Alpo

References 

1966 births
2021 deaths
American people of Puerto Rican descent
Gang members
People from East Harlem
American drug traffickers
Criminals from New York City
Hispanic and Latino American gangsters
People convicted of murder by the United States federal government
Inmates of ADX Florence
People from Washington, D.C.
Criminals from Manhattan
Gangsters from New York City